In computational complexity theory, the 3SUM problem asks if a given set of  real numbers contains three elements that sum to zero.  A generalized version, k-SUM, asks the same question on k numbers. 3SUM can be easily solved in  time, and matching  lower bounds are known in some specialized models of computation .

It was conjectured that any deterministic algorithm for the 3SUM requires  time.
In 2014, the original 3SUM conjecture was refuted by Allan Grønlund and Seth Pettie who gave a deterministic algorithm that solves 3SUM in  time.
These bounds were subsequently improved.
The current best known algorithm for 3SUM runs in  time.
The latter bound is tight (up to a logarithmic factor).  
It is still conjectured that 3SUM is unsolvable in  expected time.

Quadratic algorithm 

It is also possible to solve the problem in the same time in a comparison-based model of computing or real RAM, for which hashing is not allowed. The algorithm below first sorts the input array and then tests all possible pairs in a careful order that avoids the need to binary search for the pairs in the sorted list, achieving worst-case  time, as follows.
 sort(S);
 for i = 0 to n - 2 do
     a = S[i];
     start = i + 1;
     end = n - 1;
     while (start < end) do
         b = S[start]
         c = S[end];
         if (a + b + c == 0) then
             output a, b, c;
             // Continue search for all triplet combinations summing to zero.
             // We need to update both end and start together since the array values are distinct.
             start = start + 1;
             end = end - 1;
         else if (a + b + c > 0) then
             end = end - 1;
         else
             start = start + 1;
     end
 end

The following example shows this algorithm's execution on a small sorted array. Current values of a are shown in red, values of b and c are shown in magenta.
  -25 -10 -7 -3 2 4 8 10  (a+b+c==-25)
  -25 -10 -7 -3 2 4 8 10  (a+b+c==-22)
  . . .
  -25 -10 -7 -3 2 4 8 10  (a+b+c==-7)
  -25 -10 -7 -3 2 4 8 10  (a+b+c==-7)
  -25 -10 -7 -3 2 4 8 10  (a+b+c==-3)
  -25 -10 -7 -3 2 4 8 10  (a+b+c==2)
  -25 -10 -7 -3 2 4 8 10  (a+b+c==0)

The correctness of the algorithm can be seen as follows. Suppose we have a solution a + b + c = 0. Since the pointers only move in one direction, we can run the algorithm until the leftmost pointer points to a. Run the algorithm until either one of the remaining pointers points to b or c, whichever occurs first. Then the algorithm will run until the last pointer points to the remaining term, giving the affirmative solution.

Variants

Non-zero sum 
Instead of looking for numbers whose sum is 0, it is possible to look for numbers whose sum is any constant C. The simplest way would be to modify the original algorithm to search the hash table for the integer .

Another method:
 Subtract C/3 from all elements of the input array.
 In the modified array, find 3 elements whose sum is 0.

For example, if A=[1,2,3,4] and if you are asked to find 3SUM for C=4, then subtract 4/3 from all the elements of A, and solve it in the usual 3sum way, i.e., .

Three different arrays 
Instead of searching for the 3 numbers in a single array, we can search for them in 3 different arrays. I.e., given three arrays X, Y and Z, find three numbers , such that . Call the 1-array variant 3SUM×1 and the 3-array variant 3SUM×3.

Given a solver for 3SUM×1, the 3SUM×3 problem can be solved in the following way (assuming all elements are integers): 
 Let S be a concatenation of the arrays X, Y and Z.
 Use the 3SUM×1 oracle to find three elements  such that .
 Return . 
By the way we transformed the arrays, it is guaranteed that .

Convolution sum 
Instead of looking for arbitrary elements of the array such that:

the convolution 3sum problem (Conv3SUM) looks for elements in specific locations:

Reduction from Conv3SUM to 3SUM 
Given a solver for 3SUM, the Conv3SUM problem can be solved in the following way.
 Define a new array T, such that for every index i:  (where n is the number of elements in the array, and the indices run from 0 to n-1).
 Solve 3SUM on the array T.

Correctness proof:

Reduction from 3SUM to Conv3SUM 
Given a solver for Conv3SUM, the 3SUM problem can be solved in the following way.

The reduction uses a hash function. As a first approximation, assume that we have a linear hash function, i.e. a function h such that:

Suppose that all elements are integers in the range: 0...N-1, and that the function h maps each element to an element in the smaller range of indices: 0...n-1. Create a new array T and send each element of S to its hash value in T, i.e., for every x in S():

Initially, suppose that the mappings are unique (i.e. each cell in T accepts only a single element from S). Solve Conv3SUM on T. Now:
 Conversely, if a Conv3SUM is found on T, then obviously it corresponds to a 3SUM solution on S since T is just a permutation of S.

If a solution is found, then it is a correct solution for 3SUM on S. If no solution is found, then create a different random  and try again. By running Conv3SUM  times, the solution will be found with a high probability.

Unfortunately, we do not have linear perfect hashing, so we have to use an almost linear hash function, i.e. a function h such that:
 or

So each cell will have 2R elements, and we will have to run Conv3SUM  times.

3SUM-hardness 
A problem is called 3SUM-hard if solving it in subquadratic time implies a subquadratic-time algorithm for 3SUM. They proved that a large class of problems in computational geometry are 3SUM-hard, including the following ones. (The authors acknowledge that many of these problems are contributed by other researchers.)

 Given a set of lines in the plane, are there three that meet in a point?
 Given a set of non-intersecting axis-parallel line segments, is there a line that separates them into two non-empty subsets?
 Given a set of infinite strips in the plane, do they fully cover a given rectangle?
 Given a set of triangles in the plane, compute their measure.
 Given a set of triangles in the plane, does their union have a hole?
 A number of visibility and motion planning problems, e.g.,
 Given a set of horizontal triangles in space, can a particular triangle be seen from a particular point?
 Given a set of non-intersecting axis-parallel line segment obstacles in the plane, can a given rod be moved by translations and rotations between a start and finish positions without colliding with the obstacles?

By now there are a multitude of other problems that fall into this category.

See also 
 Subset sum problem

Notes

References 

.

.
.
.
.
.

Computational geometry
Polynomial-time problems
Unsolved problems in computer science